"Cheyenne" is a song performed by Italian singer Francesca Michielin and featuring Italian record producer and DJ Charlie Charles. The song was released as a digital download on 15 November 2019 by RCA Records as the lead single from her fourth studio album Feat (stato di natura). The song peaked at number 66 on the Italian Singles Chart and was certified gold in Italy. The song was written by Mahmood, Alessandro Raina and Charlie Charles.

Background
The song was written by Italian singer-songwriter Mahmood, with Alessandro Raina, Davide Simonetta and Charlie Charles. According to Michielin, she and Mahmood knew each other from time before, they worked together on other songs that were never released, and he knew Michielin's world and the things she wanted to communicate. He then came in contact with her, claiming he had written a song specifically for her. "It's one of the few songs I performed with lyrics that were not written by me", Michielin commented, "but when I read Mahmood's words I understood they perfectly represented me and I could not refuse".

Reviewing the song for Il Giornale, Paolo Giordano described it as "a natural painting, occasionally wild, with ventured vocal exercises, and occasionally tribal, thanks to digital and sharp percussions", with a "very urban sound, which wraps a nostalgic composition with strong chiaroscuro". The song's lyrics describe the illusion of having lived an important love story, a unique moment which disappeared without a clear reason.
Of Charles' production, Michielin said "he knew how to produce for the nature of the song: without superstructures, getting straight to the heart like an arrow".

Music video
An official music video to accompany the release of "Cheyenne" was first released onto YouTube on 21 November 2019. The video was directed by Jacopo Farina.

Live performances
On 28 November 2019, Michielin sang "Cheyenne" during the sixth live show of the thirteenth season of X Factor.
She also performed the song during the 2020 International Worker's Day concert, annually supported by Italian trade unions CGIL, CISL and UIL. As a consequence of the COVID-19 pandemic, the event was adapted to a televised show without any audience, and Michielin contributed with a set from a panoramic corner in her hometown Bassano del Grappa.

Track listing

Charts

Release history

References

2019 songs
2019 singles
Francesca Michielin songs
Songs written by Mahmood